The 1992–93 Cypriot Third Division was the 22nd season of the Cypriot third-level football league. AEZ Zakakiou won their 1st title.

Format
Fourteen teams participated in the 1992–93 Cypriot Third Division. All teams played against each other twice, once at their home and once away. The team with the most points at the end of the season crowned champions. The first two teams were promoted to 1993–94 Cypriot Second Division. The last three teams were relegated to the 1993–94 Cypriot Fourth Division.

The 3rd-placed team faced the 12th-placed team of the 1993–94 Cypriot Second Division, in a two-legged relegation play-off for one spot in the 1993–94 Cypriot Second Division.

Point system
Teams received three points for a win, one point for a draw and zero points for a loss.

League standings

Promotion playoff 
Onisilos Sotira 3 – 0 Tsaggaris Peledriou
Tsaggaris Peledriou 0 – 2 Onisilos Sotira

Sources

See also
 Cypriot Third Division
 1992–93 Cypriot First Division
 1992–93 Cypriot Cup

Cypriot Third Division seasons
Cyprus
1992–93 in Cypriot football